The Individualised Learner Record (ILR) is the primary data collection about further education and work-based learning in England. It is requested from learning providers in England's further education system. The data is used widely, most notably by the government to monitor policy implementation and the performance of the sector, and by organisations that allocate FE funding. 

ILR data is collected from providers that are in receipt of funding from the Education and Skills Funding Agency (ESFA).  It has changed name since it began, to the PLR (Personalised Learner Record) and together, forms the Learner Records Service dataset. In October 2019, the official statistics released by the Department for Education indicated it controlled over 28.4 million named, individual records.

Specification
The ILR Specification defines what data is collected in the Individualised Learner Record for each academic year (from 1 August to 31 July).

Controversy
In January 2020, the Sunday Times reported that "Betting companies have been given access to an educational database containing names, ages and addresses of 28 million children and students in one of the biggest breaches of government data", which referred to Learner Records Service data, and said that over 12,000 organisations had access to the Learning Records Service.

References

External links
 Skills Funding Agency
 ILR Specification, Validation Rules and Appendices

Education in England